Jimmy Foster may refer to:
Jimmy Foster (basketball) (born 1951), retired American basketball player
Jimmy Foster (racing driver) (born 1977), former NASCAR driver
James Foster (ice hockey) (1905–1969), often known as Jimmy, Scottish-born Canadian ice hockey goaltender

See also 
James Foster (disambiguation)
Jim Foster (disambiguation)